The Front Bottoms is the debut studio album by New Jersey rock band The Front Bottoms, released on September 6, 2011 on Bar/None.

Background
In 2008, The Front Bottoms released their first album I Hate My Friends through the social networking website MySpace. After the moderate success of the album, they released a follow-up, My Grandma Vs. Pneumonia, in 2009. This led to the band signing with Bar/None Records in mid-2010.

In February 2010, the band released an EP titled Slow Dance To Soft Rock for download on their website. They planned to also create an EP entitled Grip 'n Tie, but Bar/None pushed for them to make a full-length album instead of another EP. So they collected the songs off of Slow Dance To Soft Rock and Grip 'n Tie, and combined the two EPs into their debut self-titled album, which was released in September 2011.

Track listing

Personnel 
The Front Bottoms
 Brian Sella — vocals, guitar
 Mat Uychich — drums
 Brian Uychich — keys
 Ciaran O’Donnell — trumpet
 Drew Villafuerte — bass
 Adrianne Gold — backing vocals

References 

2011 albums
The Front Bottoms albums
Bar/None Records albums